Tōtara Vale is a suburb located on the North Shore of Auckland, New Zealand. It is under the local governance of Auckland Council. 

The suburb contains Rewi Alley Reserve, which has a memorial to Rewi Alley, a New Zealander who lived most of his life in China.

Demographics

Tōtara Vale had a population of 7,041 at the 2018 New Zealand census, an increase of 528 people (8.1%) since the 2013 census, and an increase of 738 people (11.7%) since the 2006 census. There were 2,220 households, comprising 3,534 males and 3,501 females, giving a sex ratio of 1.01 males per female, with 1,239 people (17.6%) aged under 15 years, 1,824 (25.9%) aged 15 to 29, 3,396 (48.2%) aged 30 to 64, and 579 (8.2%) aged 65 or older.

Ethnicities were 41.0% European/Pākehā, 6.8% Māori, 4.9% Pacific peoples, 49.6% Asian, and 6.2% other ethnicities. People may identify with more than one ethnicity.

The percentage of people born overseas was 57.5, compared with 27.1% nationally.

Although some people chose not to answer the census's question about religious affiliation, 41.9% had no religion, 40.1% were Christian, 0.2% had Māori religious beliefs, 5.7% were Hindu, 2.0% were Muslim, 2.7% were Buddhist and 2.8% had other religions.

Of those at least 15 years old, 1,890 (32.6%) people had a bachelor's or higher degree, and 609 (10.5%) people had no formal qualifications. 798 people (13.8%) earned over $70,000 compared to 17.2% nationally. The employment status of those at least 15 was that 3,240 (55.8%) people were employed full-time, 792 (13.7%) were part-time, and 189 (3.3%) were unemployed.

Education
Target Road School is a coeducational contributing primary school (years 1–6), with a roll of  students as of  The school opened in 1967.

Notes

Suburbs of Auckland
North Shore, New Zealand
Kaipātiki Local Board Area